The Shian Kian Weekly Review (Chinese:湘江评论/湘江評論) as known as Xiangjiang Review, was a weekly review founded by the young  Mao Zedong in Changsha, Hunan, on June 14, 1919.  It was written in the Changsha dialect.

Most articles in The Shian Kian Weekly Review was written by Mao himself. In the mid of August 1919, it was banned by Zhang Jingyao, the governor of Hunan province. It was only published 5 times.

References

Magazines published in China
Communist magazines
Defunct magazines published in China
Defunct political magazines
Magazines established in 1919
Magazines disestablished in 1919
Weekly magazines published in China
Works by Mao Zedong
Mass media in Changsha